Huang Xu (born 1967/1968) is a Chinese businessman and billionaire who founded the semiconductor manufacturer Fuzhou Rockchip Electronics. He lives in Fuzhou, China.

Forbes lists his net worth as of April 2022 at $1.1 billion USD.

References 

Chinese billionaires
Chinese company founders
20th-century Chinese businesspeople
21st-century Chinese businesspeople
Living people
1960s births